Virginia Anchestegui Rabasi (born 29 March 1957) is a Mexican former freestyle swimmer. She competed in two events at the 1972 Summer Olympics.

References

External links
 

1957 births
Living people
Mexican female freestyle swimmers
Olympic swimmers of Mexico
Swimmers at the 1972 Summer Olympics
Place of birth missing (living people)